Clepsis peritana, the garden tortrix or strawberry garden tortrix, is a species of moth of the family Tortricidae. It is found in Spain, Cuba, as well as North America, where it has been recorded from southern Canada throughout the United States.

The wingspan is 10–15 mm for males and 12–15 mm for females. The forewings are tan to brown. Males have a brown to dark-brown median fascia and a dark-brown costal spot. Females have similar markings but the median fascia and costal spot are less distinct.  Adults have been recorded on wing from March to September, in several generations per year.

The larvae feed on Chrysanthemum, Cynara cardunculus, Senecio jacobaea, Stachys, Fragaria, Citrus, Scrophularia californica and Solanum torvum. They live in silk tubes on the leaf surface. They feed on dead or decaying leaf litter, but will occasionally feed in the buds or fruits of living plants. Full-grown larvae reach a length of 13–14 mm. They have a light green abdomen, but the body colour can vary depending on the host plant. The head is yellowish brown.

References

Moths described in 1860
Clepsis